Gary Wheeler is a North Carolina-based film producer. He is the founder and president of Level Path Productions. Wheeler's recent projects include Final Solution, which was shot in South Africa and stars Tony Award winner John Kani, Midnight Clear, a Christmas Special starring Stephen Baldwin and The List, a legal thriller starring Malcolm McDowell, Hilarie Burton and Will Patton which was based on the novel of the same name by Robert Whitlow. Gary Wheeler has also directed the courtroom drama The Trial. This has actors like Bob Gunton and Matthew Modine.

Wheeler is known for making films with strong Christian themes. Wheeler often talks openly about his beliefs and how they have impacted his film career. For this reason, he is a recognized figure in the growing Christian-film industry and acts as a board member of the International Christian Visual Media organization.

In 2011 Wheeler, released a made-for-television film, The Heart of Christmas, based on a true story. It stars Candace Cameron Bure, Jeanne Neilson, Eric Jay Beck, Christopher Shone and Matthew West in his film debut. He has also made another film with GMC called Somebody's Child.

He recently served as writer and producer on the 2013 feature film Jimmy, starring Kelly Carlson, Ted Levine, Ian Colletti, and directed by Mark Freiburger.

Gary wheeler has also worked on a comedy concert with the Christian comedian Ken Davis.

Education 
Appalachian State University (College)
Regent University (Graduate School)

References

External links 
Interview with Gary Wheeler from HollywoodJesus.com
Newspaper article about Wheeler directing The List

American film producers
Appalachian State University alumni
Regent University alumni
Living people
People from Boone, North Carolina
Year of birth missing (living people)
Film directors from North Carolina